J'adore (French for "I love", and a pun on the brand Dior) is a perfume for women that was created in 1999 by French master perfumer Calice Becker for Parfums Christian Dior, with a distinct tear-drop bottle shape  designed by Hervé Van der Straeten. Actress Charlize Theron has been the face of the brand since its launch. Some perfume critics have detected a change in the recipe since the 1999 launch.

  
Dior has also released some flankers to J’Adore, such as J’Adore Eau Lumière in 2016. That version featured notes of blood orange, rose and neroli.

References

Dior
Perfumes
Products introduced in 1999
20th-century perfumes
Designer perfumes